Jiquipilco Municipality is one of the municipalities of the State of Mexico in Mexico. It is north of the Toluca Valley, part of the region consisting of the southern and western slopes of Cerro La Catedral, which has a concentration of speakers of the Otomi language. It is about 40 km from Toluca, the state capital. The name is a corruption of Nahuatl “Xiquipilli”, meaning “the place of saddlebags”. Jiquipilco is situated on the transversal volcanic axis that crosses Mexico in an area surrounded by lakes and volcanoes. This portion is called "Anahuac”.

Municipal seat
The town had a population of 1,880 as of the 2005 INEGI census. It lies at an elevation of 2,657 meters above sea level.

History
Jiquipilco came under Otomí rule ca. 1274 and developed into a locally powerful town. The Franciscans arrived in 1552 to evangelize the area and gave the already existing village the name of Juan de las Huertas for its abundance of fruit trees (huerta being Spanish for "orchard"), but its current name is San Juan Jiquipilco. The village was officially proclaimed by the Spanish on March 6, 1593.

Notable sites
In addition to the town chapel, other attractions are the sanctuary of Santa Cruz Tepexpán, which dates from the 16th and 18th centuries, and the chapel of San Felipe Santiago, constructed around the end of the 16th century. A number of colonial era buildings have been preserved such as the ex–haciendas of Mañí, Nixiní, Santa Isabel, Boximo, some of whose structures are in ruins.

Localities
As municipal seat, the town of Jiquipilco has governing jurisdiction over the following communities: Barrio Primero Buenos Aires, Bóximo, Buenavista, Buenos Aires, Colonia Benito Juárez, San Felipe Santiago, Colonia Flores Magón, Colonia la Purísima, Colonia Morelos, Dolores Amarillas, Ejido de Mañi, Ejido de Moxteje, Ejido de Santa María Nativitas, Ejido de Santa María Nativitas el Colector, Ejido Llano Grande (Planta Piloto), El Jaral (Tierra Montón), El Rincón Loma de Hidalgo,  El Santuario del Señor del Cerrito, Hacienda Nixini  Jiquipilco, La Nopalera, La Pastora, Las Golondrinas, Las Palomitas (Puerto Jiquipilli), Loma de Endotzi (Manzana Sexta), Loma de Hidalgo, Loma de San Felipe, Loma de San Pedro, Loma del Astillero, Loma del Madroño, Loma del Sitio, Loma Hermosa, Loma Hidalgo Colonia Benito Juárez, Loma Hidalgo Manzana Cuarta, Loma Vicente Guerrero, Los Ortiz, Manzana Cuarta, Manzana Cuarta de Santa Cruz Tepexpan, Manzana Primera la Capilla, Manzana Primera Parte Alta, Manzana Quinta (La Cañada), Manzana Quinta de San Bartolo Oxtotitlán, Manzana Segunda, Manzana Segunda de Santa Cruz Tepexpan, Manzana Sexta Parte Alta, Manzana Sexta Parte Baja, Manzana Sexta Parte Centro, Manzana Tercera (Bodo), Manzana Tercera de Santa Cruz Tepexpan, Manzana Tercera Juashi, Manzana Tercera Loma de Hidalgo, Manzana Tercera Panthé, Manzana Tercera Parte Baja, Moxteje, Palo Gacho, Pie del Cerro, Portezuelo, Primera Manzana de Santa Cruz Tepexpan, Ranchería de Mañi (Ex-hacienda de Mañi), Ranchería de Sila (Ejido de Sila), Rancho Alegre, Rancho Colorado, Rancho Loma de Malacota, Rancho los Quiroz, Rancho Santa Lucía, San Antonio Nixini, San Bartolo Oxtotitlán, San Felipe Santiago, San Francisco el Alto, San Isidro, San José del Sitio, San Martín Morelos, San Miguel Yuxtepec, Santa Isabel, Santa María Nativitas, Sección del Cerrito, and Tierra Blanca. 

The municipality of Jiquipilco was founded in 1822 and has a total extension of 276.5 square km. It borders the following municipalities; San Bartolo Morelos, Villa del Carbón, Ciudad Nicholás Romero, Temoaya, Ixtlahuaca, and Jocotitlán. The population is 59,969. 

A significant number of people leave the town every year in search of employment, mainly young people under 30. Many of them go to Mexico City or Toluca. 

Modern Jiquipilco was founded on March 6, 1593. 

The economy of Jiquipilco is based on agriculture and stockbreeding. The principal crops are wheat, barley and oats. Because of the difficult local topography, people continue to apply old techniques, and few farmers use mechanized equipment. Livestock is mainly represented by cattle, sheep, pigs and goats. The municipality also has abundant minerals, mostly nonmetallic, such as silica sand and gravel, and stone, obsidian and quartz, which find use in used mostly in construction  and road paving.

History
The Otomis first came to this area around 1274. According to legend, they settled here coming from a land called "Xicomostoc", where seven tribes of Otomis came from to settle in places like Jilotepec, Acxotlán, Tepexí as well as the highlands of Jiquipilco, here leading a hunting and gathering existence. The Purépecha fought here with the Otomis as they tried to conquer Matlatzinca lands. In 1478, the Aztecs invaded Matlatzinca lands, and the Aztec prince Azayácatzin personally battled the Otomi prince Tlilcuetepalin (the Black Lizard) who won the fight, thereby saving Xiquipilco.  

After the Spaniards subjugated Toluca, Gonzalo de Sandoval, known as the right arm of Hernán Cortés, promised to bring Jiquipilco under Spanish dominion in 15 days; however, he found an area populated by men who preferred to die on the battlefield. The Spanish eventually did succeed in bringing Jiquipilco into the dominion of New Spain.

References

Municipalities of the State of Mexico